Search for Paradise is a 1957 American documentary film shot in Cinerama. It was directed by Otto Lang and produced by Lowell Thomas with distribution by Cinerama Releasing Corp.

Background
In October and November 1956, a Cinerama motion picture Search for Paradise, directed by Otto Lang, and produced by Lowell Thomas, was filmed in part at Eglin Air Force Base, Florida, under the working title of Search for Shangri-La. The film "tells the story of a veteran officer, who wants 'out' but finds, after searching the world for a 'Shangrila,' [sic] that the U. S. Air Force is 'it.'"

"Some of the action-packed events captured at Eglin include F-100 'Super Sabres' breaking the sound barrier, in-flight refueling of B-47 'Stratojet' medium bombers, landings and mass fly-bys of the latest operational U. S. Air Force aircraft. Hollywood stunt flyer and combat veteran Paul Mantz, was contracted by Stanley Warner to fly his specially built B-25 in filming a number of aerial sequences . The Cinerama camera can be placed in the nose or tail gunnery slot of the World War II aircraft to film the panorama called for in this  latest 'wide-curved' screen production." Release by Stanley Warner, Inc., it was expected in the spring of 1957, according to a news article in The Okaloosa News-Journal, Crestview, Florida, in November 1956.

See also
 List of American films of 1957

References

External links

1957 films
1957 documentary films
1950s English-language films
1950s American films